Sergei Peretyagin (born 19 April 1984) is a Russian professional ice hockey defenceman who is currently playing for Kunlun Red Star of the Kontinental Hockey League (KHL). He is in his second stint with the Red Star, having played in their inaugural season in  the KHL in 2016–17 before briefly joining HC Ugra.

References

External links

1984 births
Living people
Amur Khabarovsk players
HC Donbass players
HC Kunlun Red Star players
Russian ice hockey defencemen
Torpedo Nizhny Novgorod players
HC Neftekhimik Nizhnekamsk players
Molot-Prikamye Perm players
Piráti Chomutov players
Krylya Sovetov Moscow players
SKA Saint Petersburg players
Lokomotiv Yaroslavl players
HC Vityaz players
HC Yugra players
People from Kirovo-Chepetsk
Sportspeople from Kirov Oblast
Russian expatriate sportspeople in Ukraine
Russian expatriate sportspeople in China
Russian expatriate sportspeople in the Czech Republic
Russian expatriate sportspeople in Romania
Russian expatriate sportspeople in Estonia
Expatriate ice hockey players in Ukraine
Expatriate ice hockey players in China
Expatriate ice hockey players in the Czech Republic
Expatriate ice hockey players in Romania
Expatriate ice hockey players in Estonia
Russian expatriate ice hockey people